Håungen is a small islet north of Håkallen in Kulstadholmane, the southernmost group of islets in the Thousand Islands, an archipelago south of Edgeøya. Its name derives from a neighboring island.

References

 Norwegian Polar Institute Place Names of Svalbard Database

Islands of Svalbard